Laše is a settlement in the Municipality of Šmarje pri Jelšah in eastern Slovenia. It lies in the hills south of the regional road from Šmarje to Rogaška Slatina. The area is part of the traditional Styria region and is now included in the Savinja Statistical Region.

References

External links
Laše at Geopedia

Populated places in the Municipality of Šmarje pri Jelšah